The Judo competition at the 1984 Summer Olympics continued the seven weight classes first used at the 1980 Games. With the open division, there were eight competitions. Japan returned to the top of the medal count, after boycotting the Moscow games. Because of the Soviet-led boycott of the Los Angeles games, several traditionally strong judo countries, including Cuba and the Soviet Union, did not participate. The Judo competition was held at California State University, Los Angeles.

Austrian Peter Seisenbacher in the 86 kg class won the gold medal, as did Hitoshi Saito of Japan in the over 95 kg class, feats they would repeat in 1988, becoming the first judoka to win gold at two Olympics.

Popular pro wrestler/judoka Chris Adams appeared as an advisor to the UK Judo squad, where his brother Neil Adams won a silver medal in the 78 kg class. It was the third and final Olympics the Adams brothers were involved in, competitor or otherwise.

Medal summary

Participating nations

Medal table

See also
 Judo at the Friendship Games

References

External links
 
 
 Sports123.com
 Videos of the 1984 Judo Summer Olympics
 Sports123.com
 1984 Los Angeles Summer Games Judo Event Magazine

 
1984 Summer Olympics events
O
1984
Judo competitions in the United States